Kimpton is a surname. Notable people with the surname include:

Lawrence A. Kimpton (1910–1977), American philosopher and educator
Nick Kimpton (born 1983), Australian baseball player
Robert Kimpton (1914–2007), Australian cricketer
Roger Kimpton (1916–1999), Australian cricketer
Sid Kimpton (1887–1968), English footballer and manager
Stephen Kimpton (1914–1997), Australian cricketer